Vakathanam is a Panchayat in  Kottayam district of Kerala, India. Vakathanam panchayat consists of  two villages: Vakathanam and Thottakkad.

History
In ancient times Vakathanam was ruled by Kings of Thekkumkur. Njaliakuzhy was the place where the culprits were executed by hanging.  The surrounding places are Puthupally, Thengana, Kurumbanadam and Thottakad.

Geography

The terrain is hilly with fertile soil. The western border of the panchayat has vast paddy fields. Fundamentally, this is an agricultural village. During earlier years, Vakathanam was famous for "Kappa" and "Chakka" which are the Malayalam terms for Tapioca and Jackfruit. Over time rubber plantation trees have replaced them. Vakathanam is an important commercial center of Kottayam.  The chief crops are rice and rubber. Rubber was planted in Vakathanam already in the year 1930s. In the year 1940s some cultivators of rubber cut down the trees because its cultivation did not bring any income. Its plantation began to be widespread in the year 1970s.

Churches
The christians residing here are Syrian Christians. The Syrian Orthodox Church is the numerically biggest Christian denomination in Vakathanam. St. John's Orthodox Syrian Church is the oldest Christian Church, built in 1847, until which year the Orthodox faithful had Puthupally Church as their parish. Narimattathil Yuhanon Mar Severios Thirumeni (Kochi Diocese, Malankara Orthodox Syrian Church), Perumpally Thirumeni, Parekulathu Yakub Mar Themothios Thirumeni, Geevarghese Mar Ivanious, Founder of Mar Baselious Dayara, Njaliakuzhy, Geevarghese Mar Coorilos of Niranam Dioscese of Jacobite Syrian Orthodox Church are bishops from Vakathanam. Syrian Orthodox Christians are the second largest Christian community in Kerala and they trace their origins to the mission of St. Thomas in South India in the second half of the first century AD. Later by Third Century St. Thomas Christians received priesthood from Syriac Orthodox Church of Antioch. The first Dayara and Seminary in Vakathanam was Mor Sharbil Dayara, Thrikothamangalam and is established in 1925 by Michael Mor Dionysius, Metropolitan of Southern Dioscese of Syrian Orthodox Church or Jacobite Syrian Orthodox Church (Not to confuse with Malankara Orthodox Syrian Church). It was the Seminary and Dioscese Headquarters of Jacobite Syriac Orthodox Church for some long years. During its Golden age Dayara had more than 100 theological students there to learn theology and Syriac. Services of C. V George Cor-Episcopa, Chirathalatt who was the student of this Dayara is notable to Vakathanam community as the founder of Jerusalem Mount Higher secondary School and many other developmental activities. St. John's Orthodox Valiyapally, Vakathanam is the Thalapally to most of the Malankara Orthodox parishes. Founded about the year 1847, the parish celebrated its 150th Anniversary (sesquicentuary) in 1997-1998. Manikandapuram temple (which is mentioned also in Unnuneeli Sandesam, written in the 14th century) is the most ancient religious worship centre, built by the Thekumkur Kings probably in the 14th century. The Knanaya Christians had their parish in Kottayam Valiyapally and Kottayam Edacattu Church, until the construction of Puthussery church for the Knanaya Jacobites in 1870 and St Mathew's Catholic Church for Knanaya Catholics in 1910 at Njaliakuzhy. Besides the members of the above-mentioned Churches, the believers of the Catholic Church, Syrian Orthodox Church (the famous St. Adai's church, Nalunnakal to this Church), Malankara Marthoma Syrian Church, CSI Church, St Marys Catholic church eravuchira, PRDS Church, Thottakkad and Salvation Army Church Thottakkad. Jacobite and Orthodox churches in thrikothamangalam are also present and active at Vakathanam.
Mar Baselious Dayara is a monastery built by late Metropolitan Geevarghese Mar Ivanios. It is a calm and silent place for meditation and prayer located at Thattumpuram Kunnu, near to Njaliyakuzhy. There are also Pentecostal churches in Vakathanam and Thottakkad.

Demographics
Vakathanam is a large village located in Changanassery Taluka of Kottayam district, Kerala with total 4972 families residing. The Vakathanam village has population of 19589 of which 9429 are males while 10160 are females as per Population Census 2011.

Education
Schools include:
 CMS L P School, kannanchira
 CMS L P School, Njaliyakuzhy
 MDUPS, Pongamthanam
 JMHSS, Vakathanam
 Govt. L.P.G.S Vakathanam (Penpallikkoodam)
 Govt LPBS, Unnamattom
 MGEM Higher Secondary school Njaliyakuzhy
 MMD Public School, Thrikothamangalam
 St. George U.P.School, Eravuchira
 MD U.P school, Vakathanam (Pazhanchira Pallikoodam)
 Govt Hr secondary school, Thrikothamangalam
 Govt LPBS, Marangattu 
 NSS U.P School, Thrikothamangalam
 LP School Thrikothamangalam.
 Vadekkekara LP school.
 Gregorian Higher Secondary School, Nalunnakkal
 St. Adais L.P. School Nalunnakkal
 St. Elias U.P. School Nalunnakkal
 U.P. SCHOOL VAKATHANAM

Vakathanam has one college: M.G.University College of Teacher Education, Thottakkad.

References

External links
 Vakathanam Official Website
 Govt web site for Local self governing body
Manikandapuram temple wiki mapia
 St. John's Orthodox Church (Vakathanam Valiyapally) Website

Villages in Kottayam district